The 2018 South American Cricket Championship was a cricket tournament held in Mosquera, Colombia from 23 to 26 September 2018. A men's and women's tournament held, with 2018 being the fifteenth edition of the men's South American Cricket Championship and the seventh edition of the women's event. For the first time, women's matches played at the South American Cricket Championship were granted Twenty20 International (T20I) status after the ICC granted Twenty20 International (T20I) status to matches between all of its Members; for women's teams starting from 1 July 2018 and for men's teams from 1 January 2019. Argentina were the defending champions from 2017 in both the men's and women's event, but fielded a developmental 'A' team in the men's tournament and did not enter the women's event in 2018.

Mexico won the men's tournament, defeating Uruguay by 6 wickets in the final. Brazil regained the women's title, which they had previously won in 2015 and 2016.

Participating teams

Men:

Women:

Men's championship

The eight participating teams were the national sides of Brazil, Chile, Colombia, Costa Rica, Mexico, Peru, Uruguay and an Argentina A side. Costa Rica made their debut in the South American Championship. Matches did not have T20I status. Mexico won for the second time.

Points table

Final

Women's championship

The four participating teams were the national women's sides of Brazil, Chile, Mexico and Peru. All of these teams were ICC Associate Members, but Peru's squad did not meet eligibility criteria, so all matches other than those involving Peru had WT20I status. Brazil won the event.

Points table

Final

References

International cricket competitions in 2018